The 2013 NFL Draft was the 78th annual meeting of National Football League (NFL) franchises to select newly eligible football players. The draft, which is officially called the "NFL Player Selection Meeting", was held at Radio City Music Hall in New York City on April 25 through April 27.

Eric Fisher was chosen first overall by the Kansas City Chiefs, becoming the fourth offensive tackle ever to be selected with the top pick since the first Common draft in 1967. Players who attended high school in 39 of the 50 states were selected in this draft; Florida and California led with 27 draftees each. South Carolina contributed the most drafted players on a per capita basis with 13 players, or one of every 355,798 residents of the state. Among colleges, Florida State led with 11 players selected.

A record 11 players from countries other than the United States were selected (Ghanaians Ezekiel Ansah and Edmund Kugbila, Tongan Star Lotulelei, German Björn Werner, Englishman Menelik Watson, Estonian Margus Hunt, Liberian Sio Moore, Jamaican Trevardo Williams, Australian Jesse Williams, Canadian Luke Willson and Zimbabwean Stansly Maponga), breaking the record set by the 2012 NFL Draft. Meanwhile, nine offensive linemen were selected in the first round which ties a record previously set in 1968.

The following is the breakdown of the 254 players selected by position:

Early entrants

A record 73 underclassmen forfeited any remaining NCAA eligibility they may have been eligible for and declared themselves available to be selected in the draft. Of these, 52 (71.2%) were drafted.

Determination of draft order

The draft order is based generally on each team's record from the previous season, with teams which qualified for the postseason selecting after those which failed to make the playoffs.

Player selections

Notable undrafted players

Trades
In the explanations below, (D) denotes trades that took place during the draft, while (PD) indicates trades completed pre-draft.

Round one

Round two

Round three

Round four

Round five

Round six

Round seven

Forfeited picks
Two selections in the 2013 draft were forfeited:

Supplemental draft
The supplemental draft was held on July 11, 2013. For each player selected in the supplemental draft, the team forfeits its pick in that round in the draft of the following season. 6 players were eligible, but none were selected.

Selections by conference
Selection totals by college conference (including supplemental draft):

 63 players from one conference was an NFL Draft record. It was broken in 2019, when 64 were selected.

Twelve players from Southeastern Conference (SEC) programs were selected in the first round, which tied the record for most first-round selections from a single college conference set in 2006 by the Atlantic Coast Conference.

Schools with multiple draft selections

Popular culture
During Super Bowl XLVII, the NFL presented a promotional advertisement for the 2013 Draft featuring retired athlete Deion Sanders attempting a comeback return under the name "Leon Sandcastle".  The ad followed the fictional exploits of Sandcastle (portrayed by Ball State cornerback Andre Dawson) through tryouts until he is drafted first overall by the Kansas City Chiefs.

Notes

Trade references

External links
Official site
NFL Draft 2013 at ESPN

National Football League Draft
Draft
NFL Draft
Radio City Music Hall
NFL Draft
American football in New York City
2010s in Manhattan
Sporting events in New York City
Sports in Manhattan